The following lists events that happened during 1986 in Libya.

Incumbents
 Prime Minister: Muhammad az-Zaruq Rajab (until 3 March), Jadallah Azzuz at-Talhi (starting 3 March)

Events

March
 23 March - The Gulf of Sidra Incident.

April
 15 April - U.S. aircraft bombs airfields and barracks within Libya.

 After the bombing the country was renamed Great Socialist People's Libyan Arab Jamahiriya.

 Gaddafi announces plans for a unified African gold dinar currency, to challenge the dominance of the US Dollar and Euro currencies. The African dinar would have been measured directly in terms of gold.

References

 
1980s in Libya
Years of the 20th century in Libya
Libya
Libya